Cinnamomum walaiwarense is a critically endangered species in the family Lauraceae. It is endemic to Tamil Nadu, India.

References

walaiwarense
Flora of Tamil Nadu
Critically endangered plants